Single Mothers is the fifth studio album by American musician Justin Townes Earle. It was released in September 2014 by Vagrant Records & Loose.

Track listing

Personnel
Justin Townes Earle – acoustic guitar and vocals
Paul Niehaus – guitar and pedal steel
Mark Hedman – bass
Matt Pence – drums

References

2014 albums
Vagrant Records albums
Loose Music albums
Justin Townes Earle albums